The Chess Federation of Russia, known until 2018 as the Russian Chess Federation, is the governing body for chess in Russia, and the officially recognized arm of the FIDE in Russia. It was founded on 15 February 1992, following the dissolution of the USSR Chess Federation. Its headquarters are in Moscow. The president is Andrey Filatov, who was elected in 2014. The structure of the Russian Chess Federation consists of three governing bodies: the Congress, the supervisory board, and the board of management.

On 25 September 2014, a chess museum opened in the Russian Chess Federation's mansion.

In the 2021 World Chess Championship match between Magnus Carlsen and Ian Nepomniachtchi, Nepomniachtchi competed under the Chess Federation of Russia flag. Nepomniachtchi is Russian, but the Court of Arbitration for Sport upheld a ban on Russia competing at World Championships, and it is implemented by WADA in response to the state-sponsored doping program of Russian athletes.

References

External links
  
 Official website 

National members of the European Chess Union
Chess in Russia
Chess
Chess organizations